Urceolina is a genus of South American plants in the amaryllis family, all native to Peru. It also occurs in other parts of South America.

Species 
Urceolina ayacucensis Ravenna
Urceolina cuzcoensis Vargas
Urceolina fulva Herb.
Urceolina latifolia (Herb.) Benth. & Hook.f.
Urceolina microcrater Kraenzl.
Urceolina robledoana (Vargas) Traub
Urceolina urceolata (Ruiz & Pav.) Asch. & Graebn.

formerly included
Numerous names have been coined using the name Urceolina, referring to species now considered better suited to other genera (Calicharis Caliphruria Eucharis Mathieua Plagiolirion Stenomesson Urceocharis). We here provide links to help you locate appropriate information.

References

Amaryllidaceae genera
Endemic flora of Peru
Taxa named by Ludwig Reichenbach